So Happy Together is the first full-length album by Memphis indie rock band Grifters. The album was noisy and lo-fi, even by Grifters standards. It was released on the now defunct Chicago label Sonic Noise.

It contains the re-recording "The Want," which debuted as an A Band Called Bud song. Originally released on vinyl as a six-song mini-album, it was extended to a full twelve-track album, though the album only shows ten song titles. The back of the CD tray
lists the original tracks apart from the bonus tracks and some of the lyrics to "Wreck" are featured in an image by Greg Harwell.

Critical reception
Trouser Press called the album "a bit overbearing in its negativity, but songs like the droning “Hate” (a litany of antipathies that basks in self-loathing) glean their subtext from the stirring interplay between guitarists Dave Shouse and Scott Taylor."

Original track listing

CD track listing

Album information

Grifters
 Stan Gallimore (not credited)
 Tripp Lamkins (not credited)
 David Shouse (not credited)
 Scott Taylor (not credited)

Additional credits
 Album art by Greg Harwell
 Engineering on some songs by Doug Easley and Davis McCain, Scott Taylor on most

Notes
 The Flower Shop is a Memphis florist (Anything Grows), where Shouse and Gallimore worked. The band practiced and recorded there.

References

Grifters (band) albums
1992 albums